Warlord's Tactical Manual is a book about Blood Wars published by TSR in January 1996.

Contents
Warlord's Tactical Manual offers several variations on play, new official game rules and a full pictorial card listing.

Reception
Chris Baylis reviewed Warlord's Tactical Manual for Arcane magazine, rating it a 4 out of 10 overall. Baylis comments that "In all, this offers nothing to interest players who are not familiar with the Planescape setting, and for owners of Blood Wars its only redeeming factors are the hints on deck building, the tournament rules and the clarification of some of the original obscurities. And even these are probably not enough to justify the steep asking price."

References

Books about collectible card games
Planescape